Frendi Saputra (born 27 January 1992), is an Indonesian professional footballer who plays as a full-back for Liga 1 club Dewa United.

Club career

PSIS Semarang
He was signed for PSIS Semarang to play in Liga 1 in the 2018 season. Frendi made his debut on 25 March 2018 in a match against PSM Makassar at the Andi Mattalatta Stadium, Makassar.

Dewa United
On 29 January 2023, Frendi signed a contract with Liga 1 club Dewa United from PSIS Semarang. Frendi made his league debut for the club in a 1–1 draw against Madura United.

References

External links
 Frendi Saputra at Soccerway

1992 births
Living people
Indonesian footballers
Association football defenders
Liga 2 (Indonesia) players
Liga 1 (Indonesia) players
PSIS Semarang players
Perserang Serang players
Sportspeople from Lampung